Cnemophilus is a genus of satinbirds in the family Cnemophilidae, in which all three species are native to New Guinea mountain slopes and highlands in tropical forests. The generic name Cnemophilus is Latin for "mountain/slope-lover".

Species 
The genus consists of three colorful species.

Loria's satinbird (Cnemophilus loriae)
Red satinbird (Cnemophilus sanguineus)
Yellow satinbird (Cnemophilus macgregorii)

 
Bird genera
Taxa named by Charles Walter De Vis
Taxonomy articles created by Polbot